The tribe Robinieae is one of the subdivisions of the plant family Fabaceae and the currently unranked taxon Robinioids.

The following genera are recognized by the USDA:

 Coursetia DC. 1825
 Genistidium I. M. Johnst. 1941
 Gliricidia Kunth 1823
 Hebestigma Urb. 1900

 Lennea Klotzsch 1842

 Olneya A. Gray 1855
 Peteria A. Gray 1852
 Poissonia Baill. 1870
 Poitea Vent. 1807
 Robinia L. 1753

 Sphinctospermum Rose 1906

Notes

References

External links

 
Fabaceae tribes